The Old Mission House was a historic Episcopal church mission house in Fort Yukon, Alaska.  It was constructed in 1925 as part of a Native American mission.  It was the third mission house built on the site, nearly duplicating one built in 1914 and destroyed by fire.  The house is a -story log structure in an L shape, with interior rooms constructed by frame construction.  The building was the center of the religious mission, which provided educational and health services to the local Native population.  This building was used as a school, providing boarding space for students from distant areas.  In 1957 the building was adapted for use as the medical clinic after the previous clinic building was closed and later torn down.

The building was added to the National Register of Historic Places in 1978.

The building is not standing anymore at its original location. It was located in an area subjected to heavy floods and it is unclear whether it has been destroyed or relocated elsewhere in Fort Yukon.

See also
National Register of Historic Places listings in Yukon–Koyukuk Census Area, Alaska

Notes

References

Buildings and structures on the National Register of Historic Places in Yukon–Koyukuk Census Area, Alaska
Churches on the National Register of Historic Places in Alaska
Defunct schools in Alaska
Episcopal church buildings in Alaska
Fort Yukon, Alaska
School buildings completed in 1925
School buildings on the National Register of Historic Places in Alaska
Demolished buildings and structures in Alaska
1925 establishments in Alaska